"Winter, Again" is the 16th single by Japanese band Glay. It reached #1 on the weekly Oricon charts and sold 1,638,120 copies in 1999, becoming the #2 single of the year. It charted for 18 weeks and sold a total of 1,642,530 copies, becoming Glay's best selling single. The title song was used as the East Japan Railway "SKI SKI" CM song.

Awards
Grand Prize winner at the "32nd Japan Cable Broadcast Awards"
41st Annual Japan Record Awards "Grand Prix"

Covers by other musicians
Glay's song "Winter, Again" was covered by 12012 on the compilation Crush! -90's V-Rock Best Hit Cover Songs-. The album was released on January 26, 2011, and features current visual kei bands covering songs from bands that were important to the '90s visual kei movement.

Track list
Winter, Again 
Young Oh! Oh! 
Hello My Life
Winter, Again (instrumental)

References

1999 singles
Oricon Weekly number-one singles
1999 songs
Glay songs
Song articles with missing songwriters